Kozmodemyansk is a rural locality (a selo) and the administrative center of Kozmodemyanskoye Rural Settlement, Karagaysky District, Perm Krai, Russia. The population was 602 as of 2010. There are 15 streets.

Geography 
Kozmodemyansk is located on the Yazva River, 19 km northeast of Karagay (the district's administrative centre) by road. Dubrenyata is the nearest rural locality.

References 

Rural localities in Karagaysky District